U.S. Highway 10 (US 10) is a major divided highway for almost all of its length in the U.S. state of Minnesota. The route runs through the central portion of the state, following generally the alignment of the former Northern Pacific Railway (now BNSF Railway) and connects the cities of Moorhead, Detroit Lakes, Wadena, Little Falls, St. Cloud, Anoka, Saint Paul, and Cottage Grove.

Route description
US 10 enters the state from North Dakota and heads through Moorhead parallel to Interstate 94 (I-94) and US 52 until it exits the city. US 10 then takes a more northerly route than I-94/US 52 to St. Cloud by heading through Detroit Lakes, Wadena, and Little Falls. From St. Cloud to Mounds View, US 10 is a busy route through the suburbs of St. Cloud and Minneapolis.

East of Mounds View, US 10 is marked mostly along Interstate Highways until Saint Paul, where the route runs concurrently with US 61 to Cottage Grove. US 10 then heads east to the Wisconsin state line and exits the state.

US 10 is a divided highway along most of its length through the state, with posted  speed limits along much of the way, except for two-lane or undivided four-lane stretches through Wadena and Motley. There are some  posted speed limits in the four-lane section between Elk River and Anoka and the two-lane section between Bluffton and Wadena.

Legally, the Minnesota section of US 10 is defined as unmarked Constitutional / Legislative Routes 2, 37, 27, 3, 62, and 94 in the Minnesota Statutes §§ 161.114(2) and 161.115(25). US 10 is not marked with these legislative numbers along the actual highway.

History
US 10 was established on November 11, 1926. Originally, the route split between Moorhead and St. Cloud into US 10N and US 10S. In 1934, US 10S was replaced by US 52 (now I-94) and US 10N became simply US 10.

US 10 in Minnesota was paved between St. Cloud and Minneapolis–Saint Paul as early as 1929. The remainder of the route was paved by 1950.

The four-lane divided highway section between the cities of Elk River and Anoka was constructed by 1942.

The freeway section of US 10 between the city of Anoka and University Avenue (at the Coon Rapids–Blaine boundary line) was completed in the early 1970s. The new freeway section of US 10 between University Avenue and I-35W in Mounds View was completed in 1999.

From 1934 to 1999, US 10 was located on a different alignment between Coon Rapids, Spring Lake Park, and Mounds View. This is now known as County Road 10.

When I-694 and I-35E were completed in the late 1960s, US 10 was then signed concurrently with these highways east of Mounds View to the city of Saint Paul.

As of 2017, US 10 in Minneapolis–Saint Paul has been fully upgraded to a freeway from Anoka to Hastings (save for three signalized intersections at Burns Avenue, Warner Road, and Lower Afton Road).

Major intersections

See also

References

External links

10
 Minnesota
Expressways in the United States
Transportation in Clay County, Minnesota
Transportation in Becker County, Minnesota
Transportation in Otter Tail County, Minnesota
Transportation in Wadena County, Minnesota
Transportation in Todd County, Minnesota
Transportation in Morrison County, Minnesota
Transportation in Benton County, Minnesota
Transportation in Sherburne County, Minnesota
Transportation in Anoka County, Minnesota
Transportation in Ramsey County, Minnesota
Transportation in Washington County, Minnesota